Calvin James Jones, Sr. (September 27, 1929 – October 10, 2004) was an American jazz and blues trombonist, bassist, pianist, composer, and educator. Born in Chicago, Illinois, and raised in Memphis, Tennessee, Jones moved to Washington, D.C. in the 1970s, and remained there until his death from a heart attack in October 2004.

See also
 Chicago Blues Festival
Calvin Jones BIG BAND Jazz Festival

References

External links

American jazz trombonists
Male trombonists
American blues pianists
American male pianists
American blues guitarists
American male guitarists
1929 births
2004 deaths
University of the District of Columbia faculty
Tennessee State University alumni
Howard University alumni
Blues musicians from Illinois
20th-century American guitarists
20th-century trombonists
Guitarists from Illinois
20th-century American male musicians
American male jazz musicians
20th-century American pianists